The Electravia Monotrace-E is a French electric ultralight trike that was produced by Electravia of Vaumeilh and based on the AEF Monotrace. Now out of production, when it was available it was supplied complete and ready-to-fly.

Design and development
The Monotrace-E was designed as a soaring motor glider, to comply with the Fédération Aéronautique Internationale microlight category and the US FAR 103 Ultralight Vehicles rules.

The aircraft design features a cable-braced hang glider-style high-wing, weight-shift controls, a single-seat open cockpit with a cockpit fairing, tricycle landing gear and a single electric motor in pusher configuration.

The aircraft is made from bolted-together aluminum tubing and composite materials, with its double surface wing covered in Dacron sailcloth. Its  span wing is supported by a single tube-type kingpost and uses an "A" frame weight-shift control bar. The powerplant is a  E-Motor GMPE 102 electric motor, powered by a Kokam battery pack and driving an E-Props propeller, giving about 25 minutes endurance.

Specifications (Monotrace-E)

References

Monotrace
2010s French sport aircraft
2010s French ultralight aircraft
Single-engined pusher aircraft
Ultralight trikes
Electric aircraft